Hermione Theresa Cronje is a South African prosecutor. Cronje was the head of the Investigating Directorate (ID) in the Office of the National Director of Public Prosecutions. Cronje previously worked in the National Prosecuting Authority’s Asset Forfeiture Unit and was involved in the creation of the Anti-Corruption Task Team.

Early life 

Cronje moved around a lot during her youth, including to places such as Atlantis, Elsies River and Athlone. She was named after her grandmother, Hermione.

Education 

Cronje holds a Master of Public Administration degree from the Kennedy School of Government in 2010; she also has a BA and LLB from the University of Cape Town.

Career 

Cronje worked from 1998 to 2012 in the National Prosecuting Authority (NPA). She was first an assistant to the National Director of Public Prosecutions, and later became a member of the Asset Forfeiture Unit and its Regional Head in the Western Cape. In 2012, she helped to establish the interdepartmental Anti-Corruption Task Team.

In 2012, she left the NPA for the Stolen Assets Recovery Initiative, a programme under the World Bank and the UN Office on Drugs and Crime.

In May 2019 she was appointed head of the Investigating Directorate in the Office of the National Director of Public Prosecutions. Her appointment was praised by Corruption Watch (South Africa).

In early December 2021 she resigned from her position as head of the ID. Her decision to leave reportedly stemmed from frustration at a skills shortage within the NPA that prevented the organisation from adequately pursuing various cases of state capture.

References 

Living people
University of Cape Town alumni
Year of birth missing (living people)
Harvard Kennedy School alumni
South African civil servants
South African women lawyers
20th-century South African lawyers
21st-century South African lawyers